Douglas Herbert Gray (4 April 1905 – 1972) was a Scottish footballer who spent his entire senior career with Rangers and is the longest serving player in the Glasgow club's history.

Career

Club
Born in Alford, Aberdeenshire, Gray joined the Ibrox club from Aberdeen Mugiemoss in June 1925. A right back, he played for the club 555 times in competitive matches between 1925 and 1946, earning ten league championship and six Scottish Cup winner's medals. Taking into account his appearances in war-time matches and friendlies, he made 940 appearances for the club in all, wearing the shirt more times than any other player, though John Greig is the record holder for appearances in official matches. After leaving Rangers, he acted as a coach at Clyde.

Gray is a member of the Rangers Hall of Fame.

International
Gray won ten international caps for the Scotland national football team and made six appearances for the Scottish League representative side.

References

1905 births
1972 deaths
Date of death missing
Scottish footballers
Scotland international footballers
Rangers F.C. players
People from Marr
Scottish Football League players
Clyde F.C. non-playing staff
Scottish Football League representative players
Association football fullbacks
Dyce Juniors F.C. players
Place of death missing
Footballers from Aberdeenshire
Scottish Junior Football Association players
Scotland junior international footballers